= Nagasaka =

Japanese missionary (fl. late 19th century)

Nagasaka was a Japanese missionary who brought Protestant Christianity to Korea. He first arrived in Korea in 1883.
